Alkbottle is an Austrian rock, metal and Punk rock band from Vienna, Austria. They have been notable in Austria since 1993.

They have had gold records, founded their own label, have their own beer, supported bands like Kiss, Deep Purple, ZZ Top and many more until they decided to go separate ways in 1998. After a long break the band returned in 2006 and released their album "Hier regiert der Rock 'n' Roll in 2008".

Albums 
 No Sleep Till Meidling (1993)
  (1994)
  (1995)
  (1997)
  (2008)
  (2012)

Live 
  (1996)
  (2 CD) (2004)

Compilations 
 The Last of (2 CD) (1999)
  (2011)
 Lager Export (2014)

Singles 
  (1995)
  (1995)
  (1997)
 6 Bier (2004)
  (2011)

DVD 
 5 nach XII - Lights Out Over Meidling (2002)
  (2 CD/2 DVD) (2010)

External links 
 official website
 Alkbottle interview (2006)

Austrian heavy metal musical groups